A Good Country Mile is a collaboration between Kevn Kinney and The Golden Palominos, released independently on February 21, 2012.

Track listing

Personnel 
Musicians
Jon Cowherd – Hammond organ, piano
Anton Fier – drums, percussion, production, art direction, illustration, design
Andy Hess – bass guitar
Kevn Kinney – vocals, harmonica, guitar, acoustic guitar
Aaron Lee Tasjan – guitar, acoustic guitar, backing vocals
Eleanor Whitmore – violin
Jim Campilongo – guitar on "Never Gonna Change"
Chris Masterson – guitar on "Gotta Move On (Again)", "Wild Dog Moon Pt. 2" and "Bird"
Leslie Mendelson – piano on "Bird"
Tony Scherr – guitar, acoustic guitar and bass guitar on "A Good Country Mile" and "Southwestern State"
Lianne Smith – backing vocals on "Never Gonna Change" and "Southwestern State"

Production and additional personnel
Martin Bisi – recording
Jeffery Conn – photography
Yohei Goto – mixing, recording
Chris Griffin – recording
Scott Hull – mastering
Michael Jung – recording
Kristy Knight – art direction, illustration, design
Tony Maimone – recording

References 

2012 albums
The Golden Palominos albums
Collaborative albums
Kevn Kinney albums
Albums produced by Anton Fier